Acupalpus canadensis is an insect-eating ground beetle of the Acupalpus genus.

canadensis
Beetles described in 1924